The 2005 Azores subtropical storm was the 19th nameable storm and only subtropical storm of the extremely active 2005 Atlantic hurricane season. It was not officially named by the US National Hurricane Center as it was operationally classified as a non-tropical low. The storm developed in the eastern Atlantic Ocean out of a low-pressure area that gained subtropical characteristics on 4 October. The storm was short-lived, crossing over the Azores later on 4 October before becoming extratropical again on 5 October. No damages or fatalities were reported during that time. After being absorbed into a cold front, the system went on to become Hurricane Vince, which affected the Iberian Peninsula.

Months after the hurricane season, when the National Hurricane Center was performing its annual review of the season and its named storms, forecasters Jack Beven and Eric Blake identified this previously unnoticed subtropical storm. Despite its unusual location and wide wind field, the system had a well-defined centre convecting around a warm core.

Meteorological history

The system originated out of an upper-level low just west of the Canary Islands on 28 September. The low organized itself over the next days, producing several bursts of convection. While remaining non-tropical with a cold core it moved gradually west to northwest. Early on 4 October, convection increased as the surface low organized itself, and the system became a subtropical depression.

Around the same time, the depression turned northeast into a warm sector ahead of an oncoming cold front and strengthened into a subtropical storm. After tracking through the area, the storm weakened slightly as it moved to the north-northeast. Through an interaction with the cold front early on 5 October, the subtropical storm became extratropical. The system was fully absorbed by the front later that day. The newly absorbed system would separate from the dissolving frontal system and become Subtropical Storm Vince on 8 October.

At the time, the system was not believed to have been subtropical. However, there were several post-season findings that confirmed that the system was indeed one. The first finding was the cloud pattern, which had deep convection around the centre and was better organized with a well-defined centre of circulation. In addition, the system had a warm core more typical of tropical cyclones as opposed to the cold core of extratropical cyclones. The warm-core nature also meant that there were no warm or cold fronts attached to the system, as temperatures did not change ahead of and behind the system, until an unrelated cold front passed the Azores. Satellite imagery suggested that the system was briefly a tropical storm as the warm core was found; however, the widespread wind field and the presence of an upper-level trough confirmed that it was only subtropical.

Impact, classification and records
Tropical storm-force winds were reported across parts of the Azores, primarily on the eastern islands. Ponta Delgada faced  winds, with the peak recorded gust being . No damage or fatalities were reported.

The 2005 Azores storm was not classified as a subtropical storm until April 2006, after a reassessment by the National Hurricane Center. Had it been operationally classified as such, it would have been named Tammy. Every year, the National Hurricane Center (NHC) re-analyzes the systems of the past hurricane season and revises the storm history if there is new data that was operationally unavailable. This reanalysis revealed that the storm became a subtropical storm on 4 October, making it the earliest forming 19th Atlantic tropical or subtropical storm on record. The previous record holder was an unnamed 1933 tropical storm that developed on 26 October. It held this distinction until 2020, when Hurricane Teddy attained tropical storm strength on 14 September.

See also

 Timeline of the 2005 Atlantic hurricane season
 List of Azores hurricanes

References

External links
 NHC's  on the storm

Azores Subtropical Storm, 2005
Hurricanes in the Azores
Subtropical storms
Azores ST